Hawar (or Hiwar) may refer to:

Geography
Hawar Islands, a group of Bahraini islands situated off the west coast of Qatar in the Gulf of Bahrain.
Hawar (island), the largest of the Hawar Islands
Hawar Kilis, a village in northern Aleppo Governorate, Syria

Other uses
Hawar Mulla Mohammed, Iraqi professional football player
Hawar alphabet, a writing system for one dialect of the Kurdish language
Hawar (magazine), a Kurdish magazine published between 1932 and 1943
Hiwar (magazine), a CIA-funded literary journal published between 1962 and 1967
Hawar News Agency
Iraqi National Dialogue Front or Hiwar

See also
Hawar Kilis Operations Room, a coalition of rebel groups affiliated with the Free Syrian Army